White's law, named after Leslie White and published in 1943, states that, other factors remaining constant, "culture evolves as the amount of energy harnessed per capita per year is increased, or as the efficiency of the instrumental means of putting the energy to work is increased".

Description 

White spoke of culture as a general human phenomenon and claimed not to speak of 'cultures' in the plural. His theory, published in 1959 in The Evolution of Culture: The Development of Civilization to the Fall of Rome, rekindled the interest in social evolutionism and is counted prominently among the neoevolutionists. He believed that culture – meaning the sum total of all human cultural activity on the planet – was evolving.

White differentiated between three components of culture: 
 Technological, 
 Sociological and 
 Ideological, and argued that it was the technological component which plays a primary role or is the primary determining factor responsible for the cultural evolution.

Argument synopsis 
White's materialist approach is evident in the following quote: "man as an animal species, and consequently culture as a whole, is dependent upon the material, mechanical means of adjustment to the natural environment". This technological component can be described as material, mechanical, physical and chemical instruments, as well as the way people use these techniques. White's argument on the importance of technology goes as follows:
 Technology is an attempt to solve the problems of survival.
 This attempt ultimately means capturing enough energy and diverting it for human needs.
 Societies that capture more energy and use it more efficiently have an advantage over other societies.
 Therefore, these different societies are more advanced in an evolutionary sense.

For White "the primary function of culture" and the one that determines its level of advancement is its ability to "harness and control energy". White's law states that the measure by which to judge the relative degree of evolvedness of culture was the amount of energy it could capture (energy consumption). White differentiates between five stages of human development. In the first, people use energy of their own muscles. In the second, they use the energy of domesticated animals. In the third, they use the energy of plants (so White refers to agricultural revolution here). In the fourth, they learn to use the energy of natural resources: coal, oil, gas. In the fifth, they harness nuclear energy.

White's energy formula 
White introduced a formula:

 

...where E is a measure of energy consumed per capita per year, T is the measure of efficiency of technical factors utilising the energy and C represents the degree of cultural development. In his own words: "the basic law of cultural evolution" was "culture evolves as the amount of energy harnessed per capita per year is increased, or as the efficiency of the instrumental means of putting the energy to work is increased." Therefore "we find that progress and development are affected by the improvement of the mechanical means with which energy is harnessed and put to work as well as by increasing the amounts of energy employed". Although White stops short of promising that technology is the panacea for all the problems that affect mankind, like technological utopians do, his theory treats technological factor as the most important factor in the evolution of society and is similar to the later works of Gerhard Lenski, the theory of Kardashev scale of Russian astronomer, Nikolai Kardashev and to some notions of technological singularity.

Earlier research  
In 1915, Geographer James Fairgrieve outlined a similar law of history. In its widest sense on its material side, he wrote, history is the story of man's increasing ability to control energy. By energy he meant the capacity for doing work, for causing—not controlling—movement of men and machines. Man's life is taken up by the one endeavor to harness as much energy as possible and to waste as little as possible. Any means where he can harness more or waste less marks an advance and important event in the world history. Inventions mark stages of progress. The forthcoming League of Nations, he believed in the first year of World War I, would be another stage in progress in saving energy, as it would save the energy wasted in wars.

Later research 
In White's formula C = ET, the T (technological efficiency) could hardly be mathematically expressed. Unhappy with the formula, historian Max Ostrovsky worked to find mathematical expression, as well as to reduce the totality of E (energy consumed) to an essential measurable indicator. Having researched several disciplines, including climatology, all civilizations and the Neolithic and Industrial Revolutions, he reduced White's formula to the following:

C = total cereal tonnage produced by one percent of global manpower.

Ostrovsky applied the same formula to measure national power, replacing global manpower with national. The formula mathematically demonstrates the unipolar distribution of power in the post-Cold War era. Ostrovsky claims that his version of White's law works since the Neolithic Revolution and was not altered by the Industrial Revolution. He refers to the same NASA image (above), stressing that its brightest regions are regions fertile for cereals. According to Ostrovsky, there is no any permanent geographic pivot of history because climate is impermanent. Paraphrasing Mackinder, he drew what he claims a pivot relevant for all historical ages:

Who rules the largest temperate zone with the most optimum rainfall, rules the world.
 
Another formula Ostrovsky derived from White's law explains great social revolutions:

When the percentage of manpower engaged in agriculture declines from 80 to 60, a society undergoes great social revolution whether from above or below.

Revolution from above means reformation. In one stroke, Ostrovsky mathematically explained the Dutch Revolt, the British, German and Japanese reformations, the French, Russian and Chinese great revolutions, the American Civil War and the untouched by sociologists ancient Roman revolution. Liberté, égalité, fraternité and many other slogans were heard over the barricades and frontlines but in all cases, he emphasizes, the longest result and sometimes the only result was transfer of power from land owners (plantation owners in the American case) to industrial entrepreneurs (the order of knights in the Roman case).

See also 
 
 
 
 Kardashev scale
 
 Gerhard Lenski

References

Anthropology
Historical determinism
Theories of history